The Campionato Italiano, (Italian Championship), was a domestic championship which took place in Italy for between 1958 and 1963, for Formula Junior cars.  From 1964 onwards, the championship ran Formula Three specification cars instead.

History
Formula Junior was the traditionally been regarded as the first major stepping stone for F1 hopefuls, before the introduction of Formula Three - it is typically the first point in a driver's career at which most drivers in the series are aiming at professional careers in racing rather than being amateurs and enthusiasts.

Most notably in the latter years of the Campionato Italiano, it was dominated by one driver, who won three successive titles. Between 1961 and 1963, ”Geki”, won three titles, before taking the first Italian Formula Three title the following season, in 1964

Champions

References

Sports car racing series
Auto racing series in Italy
Formula Junior